John Reed Sims (May 6, 1947 – July 16, 1984), was an American choir conductor born in Smith Center, Kansas.

Sims studied music composition at Fort Hays State University and Wichita State University, where he received a bachelor's degree in 1970. He received his master's degree in music from Indiana University Bloomington in 1972, where he studied under Philip Farkas. Moving to San Francisco, he became a music teacher by profession, serving for a time as a band teacher at Benjamin Franklin Junior High School in Daly City but soon became involved in the developing gay community.

LGBT performing arts
After hearing Supervisor Harvey Milk deliver his "Hope Speech," at which Milk encouraged lesbians and gays to come out of the closet in order to oppose anti-gay political efforts and activists, Sims was inspired to form the San Francisco Gay Freedom Day Marching Band and Twirling Corps (now San Francisco Lesbian/Gay Freedom Band), which was, at its founding in June 1978, the first openly gay musical group ever formed in United States history. In the same year, he founded the San Francisco Gay Men's Chorus, which was also the first openly gay American choral grouping. The Chorus held its first rehearsal on October 30, 1978. It made its unplanned debut a mere four weeks later, on November 27, 1978, when its members sang on the steps of the San Francisco City Hall at an impromptu memorial for Supervisor Harvey Milk and Mayor George Moscone, who had been assassinated earlier that day.

Sims stayed on to appoint a new director for the SFGMC, Dick Kramer, who helped helm the formal inaugural performance of the 115-voice SFGMC and the Marching Band at Everett Middle School on December 20, 1978. In Summer 1979, Sims directed the band in the first of several annual Gay Musical Celebrations for Pride Month.

Sims founded Golden Gate Performing Arts, Inc., an organization that sought to unify a diverse number of musical groups under the same umbrella. Member groups included the San Francisco Lesbian and Gay Men's Community Chorus  [now known as Lesbian/Gay Chorus of San Francisco] in 1980, Lambda Pro Musica orchestra (a now-defunct strings section), David Kelsey & Pure Trash, Varsity Drag, the FLAG Corps, the San Francisco Tap Troupe (1979), Published Wayne Fleisher (9-12-2016) and encouraged the formation of the Big Apple Corps GLBT band in New York by Nancy Corporon and The Great American Yankee Freedom Band of Los Angeles by Wayne Love.

Illness and death
Sims, who complained some two years earlier of exhaustion from what he thought to be hepatitis, was diagnosed with AIDS in January 1984 and died of the little-known disease on July 16 at Garden Sullivan Hospital in San Francisco. He was memorialized by more than 1,500 people at a service at Grace Cathedral, with an obituary written for Sims by a friend claiming that he offered "an alternative to the baths and the bars." John Reed Sims is buried at Fairview Cemetery at Smith Center, Kansas.

References

1947 births
1984 deaths
American male conductors (music)
AIDS-related deaths in California
Fort Hays State University alumni
Indiana University Bloomington alumni
American LGBT musicians
People from Smith Center, Kansas
Musicians from the San Francisco Bay Area
20th-century American conductors (music)
Classical musicians from California
20th-century American male musicians
20th-century American LGBT people